The 2022 Libéma Open was a professional tennis tournament played on the outdoor grass courts at Autotron Rosmalen in Rosmalen, 's-Hertogenbosch, Netherlands from 6 June to 12 June 2022. It was the 31st edition of the Rosmalen Grass Court Championships and was classified as an ATP 250 event on the men's 2022 ATP Tour and a WTA 250 event on the women's 2022 WTA Tour. The tournament was previously held in 2019 after the COVID-19 pandemic forced the double postponement of the event.

Champions

Men's singles

  Tim van Rijthoven def.  Daniil Medvedev, 6–4, 6–1

Women's singles

  Ekaterina Alexandrova def.  Aryna Sabalenka 7–5, 6–0
This was Alexandrova's second WTA Tour singles title, and first of the year

Men's doubles
 
  Wesley Koolhof /  Neal Skupski def.  Matthew Ebden /  Max Purcell 4–6, 7–5, [10–6]

Women's doubles

  Ellen Perez /  Tamara Zidanšek def.  Veronika Kudermetova /  Elise Mertens 6–3, 5–7, [12–10]

ATP Points

 Players with byes receive first round points.

Prize money 

*per team

ATP singles main draw entrants

Seeds

1 Rankings are as of May 23, 2022.

Other entrants
The following players received wildcards into the main draw:
  Jesper de Jong
  Robin Haase
  Tim van Rijthoven

The following player received entry using a protected ranking into the main draw:
  Aljaž Bedene

The following players received entry from the qualifying draw:
  Matthew Ebden 
  Sam Querrey 
  Andreas Seppi 
  Gilles Simon

Withdrawals
  Marin Čilić → replaced by  Alejandro Tabilo
  David Goffin → replaced by  Kamil Majchrzak

ATP doubles main draw entrants

Seeds

1 Rankings are as of May 23, 2022.

Other entrants
The following pairs received wildcards into the doubles main draw:
  Jesper de Jong /  Bart Stevens
  Tallon Griekspoor /  Daniil Medvedev

The following pairs received entry as alternates:
  Gijs Brouwer /  Tim van Rijthoven
  Brandon Nakashima /  Emil Ruusuvuori

Withdrawals
Before the tournament
  Marcelo Arévalo /  Jean-Julien Rojer → replaced by  Brandon Nakashima /  Emil Ruusuvuori  
  Ivan Dodig /  Austin Krajicek → replaced by  Roman Jebavý /  Denys Molchanov 
  Lloyd Glasspool /  Harri Heliövaara → replaced by  Hugo Nys /  Édouard Roger-Vasselin
  Julio Peralta /  Franko Škugor → replaced by  Julio Peralta /  David Vega Hernández
  Rajeev Ram /  Joe Salisbury → replaced by  Gijs Brouwer /  Tim van Rijthoven

WTA singles main draw entrants

Seeds

1 Rankings are as of May 23, 2022.

Other entrants 
The following players received wildcards into the main draw:
  Arianne Hartono
  Léolia Jeanjean
  Suzan Lamens

The following players received entry using a protected ranking into the singles main draw:
  Kateryna Baindl
  Kirsten Flipkens
  Daria Saville

The following players received entry from the qualifying draw:
  Olivia Gadecki
  Jamie Loeb
  Caty McNally
  Taylah Preston
  Storm Sanders
  Anastasia Tikhonova

Withdrawals 
 Before the tournament
  Marie Bouzková → replaced by  Tamara Korpatsch
  Danielle Collins → replaced by  Kirsten Flipkens
  Daria Kasatkina → replaced by  Harmony Tan
  Anastasia Pavlyuchenkova → replaced by  Greet Minnen
  Aliaksandra Sasnovich → replaced by  Kateryna Baindl
  Kateřina Siniaková → replaced by  Daria Saville

WTA doubles main draw entrants

Seeds

1 Rankings are as of May 23, 2022.

Other entrants
The following pairs received wildcards into the doubles main draw:
  Isabelle Haverlag /  Suzan Lamens
  Lesley Pattinama Kerkhove /  Yanina Wickmayer

The following pair received entry into the doubles main draw using a protected ranking:
  Paula Kania-Choduń /  Elixane Lechemia

Withdrawals
Before the tournament
  Anna Blinkova /  Aliaksandra Sasnovich → replaced by  Paula Kania-Choduń /  Elixane Lechemia 
  Kaitlyn Christian /  Lidziya Marozava → replaced by  Kaitlyn Christian /  Giuliana Olmos
  Nicole Melichar-Martinez /  Ellen Perez → replaced by  Ellen Perez /  Tamara Zidanšek

References

External links 
 

2022 WTA Tour
2022 ATP Tour
2022 in Dutch tennis
June 2022 sports events in the Netherlands
Libéma Open